Nina Crews born on May 19, 1963, in Frankfurt, Hessen, Germany is a children's author; she is the daughter of Donald Crews and Ann Jonas. She uses photographs and photocollages in her books to illustrate vibrant stories about young children. Crews currently lives with her husband and son in Brooklyn, New York.

Education 
Crews received a BA in Art from Yale University.

Books 
A Girl Like Me (2020)
Seeing Into Tomorrow (2018)
Below (2015)
Jack and the Beanstalk (2011)
The Neighborhood Sing-Along (2011)
Sky-High Guy (2010)
I’ll Catch the Moon (2005)
The Neighborhood Mother Goose (2004) 
A Ghost Story (2001)
A High, Low, Near, Far, Loud, Quiet Story (1999)
You Are Here (1998)
Snowball (1997)
One Hot Summer Day (1995)

References

External links

 
 

Year of birth missing (living people)
American children's writers
Living people
Place of birth missing (living people)
American women children's writers
21st-century American women